The Northern Ireland Court of Appeal sits in the Royal Courts of Justice in Belfast, hearing appeals on points of law in criminal and civil cases from all courts. It is the highest court in Northern Ireland, subject to review only by the Supreme Court of the United Kingdom. The Judges who sit in this court are known as Lords Justices of Appeal.

Current Lords Justices

The Honourable Lord Justice Treacy, appointed November 2017
The Right Honourable Lord Justice McCloskey, appointed 5 September 2019
The Right Honourable Lord Justice Horner, appointed 5 September 2022

Living Former Lords Justices
this list is incomplete
The Rt Hon Lord Justice Carswell 1993-1997
The Rt Hon Lord Justice Nicholson, April 1995 - January 2007 
The Rt Hon Lord Justice McCollum, appointed January 1997
The Rt Hon Lord Justice Campbell, September 1998 - August 2008
The Rt Hon Lord Justice Sheil - September 2004 - January 2007  
The Rt Hon Lord Justice Higgins, January 2007 - June 2014 
The Rt Hon Lord Justice Girvan, appointed January 2007
The Rt Hon Lord Justice Coghlin, appointed September 2008
The Rt Hon Lord Justice Gillen, September 2014-November 2017
The Rt Hon Lord Justice Weatherup, appointed September 2015 
The Rt Hon Lord Justice Weir, appointed September 2015
The Rt Hon Lord Justice Deeny, appointed September 2017
The Rt Hon Lord Justice Stephens, appointed September 2017-October 2020
The Rt Hon Lord Justice Maguire, appointed 8 January 2021

See also
 Lord Chief Justice of Northern Ireland
 List of High Court Judges of Northern Ireland

References

Lists of judges in the United Kingdom
Lists of people from Northern Ireland by occupation
Northern Ireland law-related lists